Javier "Javi" Martínez Barrio (born 21 May 1991) is a Spanish footballer who plays for Atlético Sanluqueño CF as a right back.

Club career
Barrio was born in Logroño, La Rioja. A product of hometown club UD Logroñés, he signed a contract with Racing de Santander in 2010, being assigned to the reserves in the Tercera División.

Barrio made his first-team debut on 13 December 2011, starting in a 3–2 home win against Rayo Vallecano in the round of 32 of the Copa del Rey (eventual 6–6 aggregate win). On 21 April 2013 he first appeared in the league, playing the full 90 minutes in a 1–0 loss at Villarreal CF in the Segunda División.

On 12 August 2014, Barrio joined Segunda División B side Huracán Valencia CF. He continued to compete in the lower leagues the following seasons, representing CD Guijuelo, CD Boiro, CE Sabadell FC, CF Villanovense, CD Calahorra, Haro Deportivo and Atlético Sanluqueño CF. While at the service of Calahorra, a torn meniscus sidelined him for several months.

References

External links

1991 births
Living people
Spanish footballers
Footballers from La Rioja (Spain)
Association football defenders
Segunda División players
Segunda División B players
Tercera División players
UD Logroñés players
Rayo Cantabria players
Racing de Santander players
Huracán Valencia CF players
CD Guijuelo footballers
CD Boiro footballers
CE Sabadell FC footballers
CF Villanovense players
CD Calahorra players
Haro Deportivo players
Atlético Sanluqueño CF players